Union Sportive de Douala is a Cameroonian professional football club based in Douala, that competes in the Elite One.

History
It was founded in 1958 and played its home matches in the Stade de la Réunification.

Achievements

National
Cameroon Premiere Division: (5)
 1969, 1976, 1978, 1990, 2012
Cameroon Cup: (6)
(Before independence)
 1954 (as Jeunesse Bamiléké) 
(After independence)
 1961, 1969, 1980, 1985, 1997, 2006

Africa
African Cup of Champions Clubs: (1)
 1979

African Cup Winners' Cup: (1)
 1981

Performance in CAF competitions

Notes:
 Union Douala were due to play the winner of the preliminary round tie between TP UCSA de Bangui and AS Vita Club, but following the disqualification of TP UCSA de Bangui due to their federation's debt with CAF and AS Vita Club's withdrawal, they received a bye into the second round.

Crest

Current squad

Staff

Management
Chairman
 Franck Happi

Sports

Head coach
 Oumarou Sokba

Assistant coach

Goalkeeper coach

Medical

Team doctor
 Dr. Nébil

Physio
 Dr. Armand Nebo

Masseur
 Dr. Ngamen Tondja

Physical therapist
 Épée Moume

Former coaches
 Maurice Mpondo (2007–09)
 Jules Nyongha (2011)
 Bonaventure Djonkep (2011–13)
 Théophile Feunku (2013)
 Vladan Tomić (2013–14)
 Sébastien Roques (2014)
 Joseph Diallo Siewé  (2014–17)
 Ernest Agbor (2017–18)
 Daniel Walinjom (2018–19)
 Richard Towa (2019–21)
 Oumarou Sokba (2021–present)

Notes

 
Football clubs in Cameroon
Association football clubs established in 1958
Sport in Douala
1958 establishments in French Cameroon
Sports clubs in Cameroon
CAF Champions League winning clubs
African Cup Winners Cup winning clubs